Kerastaris is a village in the municipal unit of Valtetsi, Municipality of Tripoli, Arcadia, Greece. It is situated on a hillside north of the river Alfeios at the southwestern foot of Mount Agios Elias (or Profitis Elias, 1100 m). It is 2 km west of Asea, 2 km north of Athinaio, 9 km east of Megalopoli and 16 km southwest of Tripoli. It has an altitude of 760 meters.

It is 10 minutes from the  Korinth-Tripoli - Kalamata, fifteen minutes from  Tripoli and 40 minutes from Kalamata.

Natural landscape
It is found in a wooded environment with areas forested with oak. Part of these areas is the wildlife refuge of Prophet Elias with an area of 14,500 acres. The area supplies with its streams the upper course of the river Alfeios and its tributary  Elissonas.

The main feature of Kerastari is the oak forest which grows from the borders of the village to almost the top of Mount Agios Elias. It is worth noting that the people of Kerastaris protected this forest from poaching and overgrazing so that it could grow smoothly for decades.

The forests of the area with the age-old tall oaks provided for centuries timber both for construction works (roofs, ceilings, beams, etc.) and for the production of charcoal. For this reason they attracted lumberjacks from other areas. Those coming from Agios Petros were the last to systematically clear the forests during the Turkish occupation.

Name 
The name of the village comes from the word "kerestes" - wood used in building constructions and in shipbuilding which is a linguistic loan from the Turkish word "kereste" - timber, wood, building timber, which in turn comes from the Persian "keraste". When the suffix - ari is added, the word Kerastari appears as a place name that describes the place where such timber is exported.

Brief History 
The area has been inhabited by the ancient Arcadian tribe Mainalia, once centered on Mount Mainalos. Mount Mainalos was considered sacred to the Arcadian god Pan and the place where Arkas, ancestor of the Arcadians and the third mythical king of Arcadia, was buried. Mount Mainalos was securely identified with today’s mountain of Agios Elias, at the foot of which the modern village of Kerastaris is located. An important find of great artistic value is the bronze articraft of the 7th century B.C. probably made in the laboratories of Argos. It represents two warriors with octagonal shields and chariots on the right and left. It is exhibited at the National Archaeological Museum. 

Nowadays, the name Mainalos is mistakenly connected to the highest mountain in Arcadia, Maínalo mountain, which is, however, located 25 kilometers to the north.

At the top of Agios Elias are located the remains of the Late Archaic Doric Temple of around 500 B.C., dedicated to Gods of ancient Greeks Athena and Poseidon. 

In recent years, residents from various parts of the Peloponnese have moved here as a result of its long turbulent history. In the census of the Provider of Republic of Venice in the Venetian-occupied Peloponnese Francesco Grimani, of the year 1700, the village belongs to the province of  Leontari, it is referred to as "Chierastani" and has 10 families and 55 inhabitants.

The people of Kerastaris participated in the Greek Revolution of 1821 and in all the wars of the nation. From the beginning of the 20th century they started migrating mainly to the USA. After the end of the greek civil war, migration intensified to the United States, Canada and Australia, while there was also internal migration to Athens and elsewhere, resulting in a significant reduction in population.

With the money of the first Kerastaris immigrants, the school building was built in 1925, while with the donation of Fotis Bezos (Frank Anthony Bazos), an immigrant to Canada, pioneering businessman and founder of the Becker Milk Company Limited, the building of the cultural center-hostel Kerastari was built in 1992.

Sights

Sights of the village are the church, a monument of post-Byzantine heritage, which began to be built in 1855 by the famous craftsmen from Langadia Arkadias, as well as the ancient plane tree with a trunk diameter of 6 meters.

Today

The main occupation of the few inhabitants of Kerastaris is livestock, agricultural crops and beekeeping less than before. Today it is a vacation spot for its former residents, who live in urban centers and abroad.

Its inhabitants celebrate the icon of the Virgin Mary of the Mourning of Kerastari on the Sunday of the Myrrh Bearers.

In recent years it has become known from astronomy conferences (workshops) held every five years by Tasso Tzioumis, a Kerastari-born researcher at CSIRO Astronomy and Space Science.

Population

See also
List of settlements in Arcadia

External links
History and information about Kerastaris
 Kerastaris on the GTP Travel Pages

References

Populated places in Arcadia, Peloponnese